De Graff is an unincorporated community in Butler County, Kansas, United States.

History
In 1877, the Florence, El Dorado, and Walnut Valley Railroad Company built a branch line from Florence to El Dorado, and a station called De Graff was built.  In 1881, the rail line was extended to Douglass, then later to Arkansas City.  The line was leased and operated by the Atchison, Topeka and Santa Fe Railway.  The line from Florence through Burns to El Dorado was abandoned in 1942.  The original branch line connected Florence through El Dorado to Arkansas City.

De Graff was founded around a train station in 1877, then stagnated after the railroad was abandoned in 1942.   De Graff had a post office from 1887 until 1942.

Climate
The climate in this area is characterized by hot, humid summers and generally mild to cool winters.  According to the Köppen Climate Classification system, De Graff has a humid subtropical climate, abbreviated "Cfa" on climate maps.

Education
The community is served by El Dorado USD 490 public school district.

Infrastructure
U.S. Route 77 highway runs north–south on the east side of De Graff, and follows roughly parallel to the old railway.

See also
 National Register of Historic Places listings in Butler County, Kansas

References

Further reading

External links
 Walter's Pumpkin Patch, 0.5 mile south of De Graff
 Butler County maps: Current, Historic, KDOT

Unincorporated communities in Butler County, Kansas
Unincorporated communities in Kansas